is a former Japanese football player.

Playing career
Nakajima was born in Saitama on July 3, 1980. He joined J1 League club Kashima Antlers from youth team in 1999. On May 8, he debuted against Avispa Fukuoka. Although he played several matches as forward in 1999, he could hardly play in the match until 2001 and retired end of 2001 season.

Club statistics

References

External links

s-rights.co.jp

1980 births
Living people
Association football people from Saitama Prefecture
Japanese footballers
J1 League players
Kashima Antlers players
Association football forwards